C. Kim Bracey is an American politician. She served as the 24th Mayor of York, Pennsylvania, from January 4, 2010, to January 2, 2018. She was the first African American mayor of the city and the second woman to hold the office. Betty Marshall, who was elected in 1977, served as the first female mayor of York from 1978 to 1982.

Biography

Early life
Bracey was born in York, Pennsylvania.  She graduated from William Penn Senior High School and attended Bloomsburg University before enlisting in the United States Air Force in 1984. Bracey was honorably discharged from the Air Force in 1994, reaching the rank of technical sergeant (E-6). She moved back to York in 1994 after leaving the Air Force and took a position with the Crispus Attucks Association.

Bracey is married to her husband, Vernon (who petitioned for divorce in 2011;). She is a member of the Friendship Baptist Church in York.

Political career
In 2003, York Mayor John Brenner appointed Bracey as the Director of the Department of Community Development. She served in the office from June 2003 until January 2009.

Mayor John S. Brenner announced on July 2, 2008, that he would not seek re-election in 2009, more than a year before the mayoral election. Brenner cited the impending birth of his second child as a major factor in his decision to retire from the mayor's office. He endorsed Bracey, who had served as his Director of the Department of Community Development, in the 2009 election. Bracey resigned as director of community development, in January 2009 which is the city's economic development agency, to pursue her campaign for mayor.

Bracey defeated three other Democratic candidates in the primary election on May 19, 2009. Bracey won the general election on November 3, 2009, beating her  Republican opponent, Wendell Banks. Bracey received 2,582, or 81% of the total vote, while Banks placed a distant second with 602 votes, or 19%.

Bracey was sworn in as York's 24th mayor on January 4, 2010.  She was re-elected in 2013, though lost a second re-election attempt in 2017 to city council president Michael Helfrich, who was inaugurated to succeed Bracey on January 2, 2018.

References

Living people
Year of birth missing (living people)
Mayors of York, Pennsylvania
Women mayors of places in Pennsylvania
Pennsylvania Democrats
United States Air Force airmen
African-American mayors in Pennsylvania
Women in the United States Air Force
African-American female military personnel
2012 United States presidential electors
21st-century American women politicians
21st-century American politicians
21st-century African-American women
21st-century African-American politicians
African-American United States Air Force personnel
African-American women mayors